Giambatista Borgia (died 1560) was an Italian Roman Catholic prelate who served as Bishop of Massa Lubrense (1545–1560).

Biography
On 18 March 1545, he was appointed by Pope Paul III as Bishop of Massa Lubrense.
He served as Bishop of Massa Lubrense until his death in 1560.

References

External links and additional sources
 (for Chronology of Bishops) 
 (for Chronology of Bishops) 

1560 deaths
16th-century Italian Roman Catholic bishops
Bishops appointed by Pope Paul III